Magnus Daniel Stenberg is a Swedish developer and recipient of the 2017 Polhem Prize for his work on cURL.

He was born and raised in Huddinge, a suburb south of Sweden's capital Stockholm. He created a utility which, after various name and license changes, became known as cURL and is currently available under the MIT License.

From 2013 to 2018, he worked for Mozilla. In February 2019, Daniel joined wolfSSL to offer commercial support for cURL and to work on cURL as full-time as possible. He is active in the IETF, a member of the working groups for HTTP/2 and QUIC, and contributed to several RFCs.

See also
 curl
 wget

References

Living people
Swedish computer scientists
Free software programmers
1970 births
Swedish computer programmers